Ramakrishna Mission Vidyapith, Purulia is a residential school for boys in Purulia, West Bengal, India. It runs under the Gurukula system and is a branch of the Ramakrishna Mission. It was founded by Swami Hiranmayananda in 1957. The chief minister of West Bengal requested Ramakrishna Mission to establish an educational institution in Purulia. It won the state's "Best School Award 2018" in 2018 and was given an award by Mamata Banerjee and Partha Chatterjee, the chief minister.

Gallery

References

External links 
 
 
 

Boys' schools in India
Schools affiliated with the Ramakrishna Mission
Boarding schools in West Bengal
High schools and secondary schools in West Bengal
Schools in Purulia district
Purulia
Educational institutions established in 1957
1957 establishments in West Bengal